The 1852 Massachusetts gubernatorial election was held on November 8.

Democratic Governor George S. Boutwell declined to run for a third term in office. John H. Clifford won the race to succeed him. Because no candidate received a majority of the vote, the legislature selected Clifford as the winner.

Democratic nominations

Candidates
Henry W. Bishop, Judge of the Court of Common Pleas
David Henshaw, former U.S. Secretary of the Navy

Convention and split
With the imminent presidential election creating an increased emphasis on national politics, the Democratic Party became divided over the issue of slavery and its expansion in the western territories. Coalitionists favored a moderate approach which allowed the party to reconcile with its ally in the past three elections, the Free Soil Party. Without the Free Soilers, the party likely had no chance at winning. The Coalitionists held the majority of the party and nominated Henry W. Bishop of Lenox for governor in September. A breakaway faction calling themselves "National Democrats" rejected the Bishop ticket. The National Democrats nominated David Henshaw, a long-time ally of John C. Calhoun who had served as Secretary of the Navy in the John Tyler administration.

General election

Candidates
Henry W. Bishop, Judge of the Court of Common Pleas (Democratic)
John H. Clifford, Attorney General of Massachusetts (Whig)
David Henshaw, former U.S. Secretary of the Navy (Ind. Democratic)
Horace Mann, U.S. Representative from Newton (Free Soil)
Edward A. Vose (Independent)

Results

Legislative vote
The Massachusetts House of Representatives certified the popular returns on January 12. John Clifford was the first candidate nominated for Governor with 148 votes. On a second ballot, Henry Bishop was nominated with 189 votes. In the Massachusetts State Senate, Clifford defeated Bishop 29–5.

See also
 1852 Massachusetts legislature

References

Governor
1852
Massachusetts
November 1852 events